A list of notable films produced in Greece in the 1960s.

1960s

External links
 Greek film at the IMDb

1960s
Greek
Films